Sphaerodactylus beattyi, also known commonly as the Saint Croix's sphaero, Beatty's least gecko, and the cotton ginner gecko, is a species of lizard in the family Sphaerodactylidae. The species is endemic to Saint Croix in the United States Virgin Islands. There are two recognized subspecies.

Etymology
The specific name, beattyi, is in honor of Crucian naturalist Harry Andrew Beatty (1902–1989).

The subspecific name, seamani, is in honor of Crucian George A. Seaman.

Habitat

Reproduction
S. beattyi is oviparous.

Subspecies
Two subspecies are recognized as being valid, including the nominotypical subspecies.
Sphaerodactylus beattyi beattyi 
Sphaerodactylus beattyi seamani

References

Further reading
Grant C (1937). "Herpetological Notes with New Species from the American and British Virgin Islands, 1936". Journal of the Department of Agriculture of Puerto Rico 21: 503–522. (Sphaerodactylus beattyi, new species, p. 508).
Rösler H (2000). "Kommentierte Liste der rezent, subrezent und fossil bekannten Geckotaxa (Reptilia: Gekkonomorpha) ". Gekkota 2: 28–153. (Sphaerodactylus beattyi, p. 110). (in German).
Schwartz A, Henderson RW (1991). Amphibians and Reptiles of the West Indies: Descriptions, Distributions, and Natural History. Gainesville, Florida: University of Florida Press. 720 pp. . (Sphaerodactylus beattyi, p. 471).
Schwartz A, Thomas R (1975). A Check-list of West Indian Amphibians and Reptiles. Carnegie Museum of Natural History Special Publication No. 1. Pittsburgh, Pennsylvania: Carnegie Museum of Natural History. 216 pp. (Sphaerodactylus beattyi, p. 145).
Thomas R, Schwartz A (1966). "Sphaerodactylus (Gekkonidae) in the Greater Puerto Rico Region". Bulletin of the Florida State Museum, Biological Sciences 10 (6): 193–260. (Sphaerodactylus beattyi seamani, new subspecies, pp. 251–253, Figure 10).

Sphaerodactylus
Endemic fauna of the United States Virgin Islands
Reptiles of the United States Virgin Islands
Reptiles described in 1937
Taxa named by Chapman Grant